The Kandassankadavu Boat Race (Malayalam: കണ്ടശ്ശാംകടവ് ജലോത്സവം) is a popular Vallam Kali held in the Enamakkal Lake and Conolly Canal in Kandassankadavu of Thrissur District, Kerala, India. The race is conducted on the Thiruvonam day of the Onam festival followed by a 10-day festival. The trophy is known as Chief Minister's Ever-Rolling Trophy. Competitions were held for the Iruttukuthi and Churulan boats category.

History
The race was started in 1955 when the Kerala state was formed. Due to financial problems the boat race was stopped by the organisers for a long time. In 2011, with the support of Government of Kerala, Thrissur District Tourist Promotion and Manaloor Grama Panchayat the race was restarted.

Winners

Other races in Kerala
 Triprayar Boat Race
 Kumarakom Boat Race
 Nehru Trophy Boat Race
 President's Trophy Boat Race
 Aranmula Uthrattadi Vallamkali

References

Paddling
Boat races in Thrissur